Zapf Creation is a toy company based near Coburg, Germany which specialises in the manufacture of multi-functional baby dolls. Its franchises have become very popular around the world; among its successful creations are Maggie Raggies, Baby Born, Baby Annabell, and Chou Chou.

Company
Zapf Creation AG develops, manufactures and sells multi-functional dolls in Europe, Asia, New Zealand and South America. The  products are primarily aimed at girls between the ages of two and eight. The company was founded in 1934 and is based in Rödental, near Coburg, Germany.

Products
Most of the Zapf Creation products are baby and toddler dolls and these are occasionally used to teach future parents the life skills they will need.

Baby Born
Baby Born (introduced in 1991) is often considered to be the most lifelike of the series due to the numerous functions that the doll can perform. These include crying, urinating and being quietened by a pacifier which makes the doll's eyes shut in later versions. All these actions can be performed with no use of batteries which makes it possible to bathe the doll. The most recent version includes nine functions and eleven accessories.

Varieties of this model include boy, girl and ethnic girl, each anatomically correct and having its own color style for hair and skin.

 1991 model: The original model. The eyes are in a squinting position and do not close. The doll cries when the right arm is pressed and squeaks when the left arm is pressed. The doll is also not waterproof.
 2004 model: This is the first version of the doll that can be bathed. The doll also comes with a duck toy and a duck-themed outfit to represent the new feature.
 2006 model: Nicknamed "Magic Eyes", This version is the first to include functional eyes. They can be closed when the special dummy is placed into the doll. This is the first version to be made in a boy version.
 2008 model: Nicknamed "Magic Potty". This version is similar to the previous model but includes a potty that makes sounds when the button is pressed. The doll no longer has a squeaker inside its left arm.
 2009 model: Nicknamed "Magic Feeding". This version includes an Ice Cream that can make the doll's face messy.
 2011 model: Removes the Ice Cream, but nonetheless functions the same.
 2012 model: Nicknamed "Baby Born Interactive". A chip inside the doll can allow it to detect comparable accessories so they can all use them.
 2016 model: Nicknamed “Baby Born Interactive”. It is similar to the above doll.
 2018 model: Nicknamed "Soft Touch". This is the first version to include the “Soft Touch” feature, where all the functionalities of the doll are now done through the softer body. The crying function is moved to the top of the chest instead of on her left arm.
 2021 model: Nicknamed "Magic Eyes". It is the same as the above doll but now includes a Magic Eyes feature when the owner turns the dummy around.

Other Variants
Pick Me Up!: A battery-operated doll that has touch sensors.
Talking Baby Born: A trilingual and battery-operated doll that can speak three languages: English, Spanish and French.
Sister and Brother: These dolls are larger than the standard Baby Born. They can drink water and cry as with the original, and also have bendable knees and legs that can allow them to stand on their own, and come with combs for their hair. Sister also comes with accessories for the hair.
Mommy, Make Me Better!: A re-release of the Chou Chou product of the same name under the Baby Born brand. Sold in the North American market by MGA Entertainment.
Little Girl and Little Boy: Smaller versions of the standard Baby Born doll with six lifelike functions. They are not the same as the "My Little Baby Born" dolls, as they are fully functioned.

My Little Baby Born
My Little Baby Born are versions of the regular Baby Born doll. They work the same but instead are made for younger children.
My Little Baby Born: A doll that doesn't have the functions that the bigger Baby Born does but is a good cheap alternative for young children. This is the original doll.
I Can Swim: A battery-operated doll that has a special sensor. When it is in water, it can swim around.
Splashing Baby: A doll that sits on the shallow water and will splash around when it does this. Splashing Baby can also move its head due to this.
First Love: is a softer version of the regular My Little Baby Born doll.
Hold My Hands: A lullaby-singing doll. The lullaby happens when pressing Hold My Hands' hands.
Interactive Twins: Interactive Twins can interact with each other and are separate dolls.
Bathing Fun/Bathing Baby: A softer version of the regular My Little Baby Born doll made for bathing.
Nappy Time: A doll that can use the potty and kick its legs when feeling upset or happy.
Walks: A battery-operated doll that walks and makes a number of sounds when its rattle is shaken. This doll, unlike other Zapf products, is made out of a hard plastic and functions itself more like a robot.

Baby Annabell
Baby Annabell (introduced in 1998) is perhaps the most famous of Zapf's products, Baby Annabell is a battery-operated doll that comes with a variety of accessories and has a large product line that includes extra articles, outfits, and pieces of furniture. Unlike Baby Born, Baby Annabell's body is made out of soft, plush-like material where the doll's battery box is stored in. The main function performed by the newer dolls (Version 3 or newer) is to let it drink water, and when it cries, the water can come out of its eyes which makes it look like the doll has tears, and also to use the toilet. This doll could perhaps be classed as a "modern autonomous doll". Older versions of the doll also would recognize sounds (e.g., a Rattle or the owner's voice) and will cry if any sound is heard when it is asleep.

Alike Baby Born, the doll comes in Girl, Brother and Ethnic girl versions.

Version 1 (1998): The original model. She drinks from her bottle, reacts to sounds (e.g., her Rattle), and cries when she is woken up. Unlike later versions, the doll does not have any electronics in her head (with her eyes being simple doll eyes that close when the doll is laid down).
Version 2 (2002): Also referred to as "Baby Annabell Interactive". This version adds a motor to the head, allowing for the doll to make realistic sucking motions when sucking on her bottle or dummy and can open and close her eyes while doing so. It is very similar to "Rock A Bye Chou Chou" in terms of functionality although it is a completely different doll. This is also the first version to include an Ethnic Girl version.
Version 3 (2005): This version is the first to include a water tank in the head, which can allow for the doll to drink water and cry real tears.
Version 4 (2007): Adds the ability for the doll to turn its head when hearing sounds or if her name is said. The doll makes some of the same neutral sounds as Version 3.
Version 5 (2009): Adds the ability for the doll to react to a sheep toy that can make the baby happy with its lullaby sounds, although the ability for the doll to turn its head is removed. The doll has all new default sounds but still does perform some of the sounds that Versions 3-4 use. This is the first version to come in a "Brother" variant, which features a brown-eyed doll with a blue outfit. This is also the only version to come in an "Ethnic Brother" variant.
Version 6 (2011): Adds the ability for the doll to move her arms. Due to this feature, it lacks electronics in her head as well as a water tank, so the doll can't cry real tears or drink real water, and the eyes are just standard doll eyes. It was only available in a standard Girl version.
Version 7 (2012): The ability for the doll to cry real tears and drink water returns due to the poor reception of Version 6, however, it no longer has the ability to react to sounds. It also has new default sounds.
Version 8 (2013): Identical to Version 7. The only change is that it has some extra accessories.
Version 9 (2014): Adds the ability for the doll to be rocked to sleep. It has the same sounds as the previous models.
Version 10 (2016): Adds the ability for the doll to wee in its potty and wet its nappy when her belly button is pressed. This version has a different face design than the previous dolls but makes the same sounds like the previous three versions.
Version 11 (2019): Adds the ability for the doll to laugh when its belly button is pressed, which may make the doll fart, which it can make the doll laugh more, and the ability to bounce the doll on the owner's knee. It however removes the ability for the doll to wee and also removes the patting function (which was moved to a separate button on the back). It will only cry when held upside down. It has all new default sounds, however, its dummy sounds are the same as the previous version. This is also the first version where the dolls all have separate personalities and names - Annabell for the Girl, Alexander for the Boy, and Leah for the Ethnic Girl.

My First Baby Annabell and other variants
This range of dolls are smaller versions of the Baby Annabell doll made for younger children.
My First Baby Annabell: A doll that doesn't run on batteries nor have the features that the main doll has but is still a good alternative for younger children. This is the original doll.
Time to Sleep: A doll that can be used to practice sleeping. Time To Sleep can sleep and close its eyes and, after a short while, wake up.
Newborn: A squishy and softer version of the My First Baby Annabell made for younger children.
Baby Moves: is a doll that can move its arms and legs like a real baby.
Learns to Walk: A rerelease of the "Learn To Walk Chou Chou" doll under the Baby Annabell brand.
Sister: A version of the doll that is the same size as the normal models but works more like the "My First Baby Annabell" doll.
Milly Feels Better: A doll that works similar to the "Mommy Make Me Better Chou Chou" doll but is an all-new doll.
Baby Fun: A doll that works like the bigger dolls but doesn't have the functions those models have.

Chou Chou
Chou Chou is another doll manufactured by Zapf Creation designed to be very realistic, having accessories to support role playing for children. Chou Chou is sometimes used to teach young girls, in particular, about various stages of a baby's life including the first tooth and minor ailments, though most dolls are just played with.

This doll comes in a variety of types and has many lifelike functions.
Baby Chou Chou/Giggling Chou Chou: A doll that laughs after squeezing the body. Unlike other Zapf dolls, the expression is more in the shape of a grin, akin to the Jolly Dollies range.
Mommy Make Me Better Chou Chou: A doll that comes in a yellow cap and baby girl outfit. This doll becomes unwell and the owner needs to make it better. The heartbeat can be heard and Chou Chou can be given medicine when it has a fever. Chou Chou makes sounds such as slurping.

Love Me Chou Chou: A doll that comes in a pink baby cloth with an attached hood. The owner must find what the doll is wanting, including a blanket or its bottle. Chou Chou can kick its legs when it is upset, open its mouth, cry, laugh, and make slurping sounds when given a drink. Chou Chou also comes with an electronic necklace that the owner can wear, and whenever the baby cries and the user holds it, it cheers up and the doll could even laugh as well.

Chou Chou My First Tooth: A doll that represents a slightly older baby. When Chou Chou develops a tooth, it cries and the owner has to make it feel better. Chou Chou also makes other baby sounds such as laughing and slurping.
Talking Chou Chou: A version of Chou Chou that can talk. She has sensors that detect compatible accessories (including a Bear that she can talk to). She utters basic phrases in English and Spanish. The doll is available in normal and Ethnic Girl variants.
Rock A Bye Chou Chou: A Chou Chou doll that functions similarly to Zapf's existing Baby Annabell doll. Chou Chou can be fed its bottle, go to sleep, and cry when woken up. It was named the number one doll in the Duracell Kids' Choice Toy Survey in the US in 2001.
Learn to Walk Chou Chou: A doll that can crawl by itself and can be encouraged to walk by holding its hand. Chou Chou can trip up and cry when crawling, but can try again.
Magic Pacifer - This doll includes an electronic dummy that can tell how the doll is. When Chou Chou cries, the pacifier will tell the owner what is wrong with the doll, either if she wants her bottle, if she has a temperature, or if she wants to sleep or play. The Dummy also displays the current day of the week, and the doll's birthday.
Baby Monitor - Similar to the above doll in functionalities. The doll includes an electronic Baby Monitor that will tell the owner on why Chou Chou is crying, either for her bottle, if she is tired, or wants to play.
Baby Buddies: Dolls that interact with each other and say different phrases.
Baby Buddies 2: Dolls that say more phrases than the other baby buddies.

Sam and Sally
Sam and Sally are quite large dolls at around  each (similar to other dolls of their size), which means that they can either be dressed in the provided outfits or in real baby clothes of their size (0–3 months and 3–6 months fit the dolls).

Annabell Tween
Annabell Tween is a line of dolls come that in many versions, each wearing different outfits. These dolls are aimed toward older girls.

References

Doll manufacturing companies
Toy companies of Germany